Discography of Michael Brecker.

Discography

As leader/co-leader 
 Cityscape with Claus Ogerman (Warner Bros., 1982)
 Michael Brecker (Impulse!, 1987)
 Don't Try This at Home (Impulse!, 1988)
 Now You See It...Now You Don't (GRP, 1990)
 Tales from the Hudson (Impulse!, 1996)
 Two Blocks from the Edge (Impulse!, 1998)
 Time Is of the Essence (Verve, 1999)
 Nearness of You: The Ballad Book (Verve, 2001) - recorded in 2000
 Directions in Music: Live at Massey Hall with Herbie Hancock, Roy Hargrove (Verve, 2002) - recorded in 2001
 Wide Angles (Verve, 2003)
 Pilgrimage (Heads Up, 2007) - recorded in 2006

As Brecker Brothers
 The Brecker Bros. (Arista, 1975)
 Back to Back (Arista, 1976)
 Don't Stop the Music (Arista, 1977)
 Heavy Metal Be-Bop (Arista, 1978) – live
 Detente (Arista, 1980)
 Straphangin' (Arista, 1981)
 Return of the Brecker Brothers (GRP, 1992)
 Out of the Loop (GRP, 1994) - recorded in 1992
Compilations
 The Brecker Bros. Collection, Vol 1 (Novus, 1990)
 The Brecker Bros. Collection, Vol 2 (Novus, 1991)

As Steps
 Step by Step (Better Days, 1981)
 Smokin' in the Pit (Better Days, 1981)
 Paradox (Better Days, 1982)

As Steps Ahead
 Steps Ahead (Elektra, 1983)
 Modern Times (Elektra, 1984)
 Magnetic (Elektra, 1986)
 Live in Tokyo (NYC, 1994) - recorded in 1986

With others 
 (Original Motion Picture Soundtrack) Wiz, The 1978 MCA 2-MCA6010
 (Original Motion Picture Soundtrack) Warriors, The 1979 A&M SP-3151
 (Original Motion Picture Soundtrack) Footloose 1984 Columbia JS39242
 (Original Motion Picture Soundtrack) 9 1986 Capitol CDP46722
 (Original Motion Picture Soundtrack) Bright Lights, Big City 1988 W.P. 25688-1
 (Original Motion Picture Soundtrack) Midnight in the Garden of Good and Evil
 (Original TV Soundtrack) A House Full of Love (Bill Cosby Show) 1986 Columbia CK 40270
 ACOM Cozmopolitan 1981 East World/EMI EWJ-80193
 Abercrombie, John Night 1984 ECM 8232122(ECM1272)
 Abercrombie, John Getting There 1988 ECM 8334942(ECM1321)
 Abercrombie, John Works (Compilation) 1988 ECM ECM 837 275-2
 Acogny, Georges Guitars on the Move 1983 String 33855
 Aerosmith Pandora's Box (Compilation)
 Aerosmith Get Your Wings 1974 Columbia PC32847
 Air - Air 1971 Embryo SD-733
 Akkerman, Jan 3 1979 Atlantic K50664
 Alessi All for a Reason 1978 A&M 4657
 Allison, Luther Motown Years 1972–1976 (Compilation)
 Allison, Luther Night Life 1979 Gordy G-974V1
 Ambrosetti, Franco Wings 1983 Enja 4068
 Ambrosetti, Franco Tentets 1985 Enja
 Ambrosetti, Franco Gin and Pentatonic (Compilation) 1992 Enja 4096 2
 Arista All Stars Blue Montreux 1978 Arista AB-4224
 Arista All Stars Blue Montreux II 1978 Arista AB-4245
 Arista All Stars Blue Montreux (CD Compilation) 1988 BMG 6573-2-RB
 Artful Doger Artful Doger 1977 Columbia 34846
 Ashford & Simpson Stay Free 1979 Warner Bros. HS3357
 Ashford & Simpson Solid 1984 Capitol ECS-81696
 Aurex Jazz Festival '80 Jazz of the 80's 1983 East World EWJ-80190
 Aurex Jazz Festival '80 Live Special (Compilation) 1983 East World EWJ-80253
 Austin, Patti End of a Rainbow 1976 CTI CTI-5001
 Austin, Patti Havana Candy 1977 CTI CTI-5006
 Austin, Patti Live at the Bottom Line 1979 CTI CTI-7086
 Austin, Patti Body Language 1980 CTI CTI-36503
 Austin, Patti Gettin' Away with Murder 1985 Qwest 25276-1
 Austin, Patti The Real Me 1988 Qwest 9 25696-2
 Average White Band Average White Band 1974 Atlantic SD-7308(19116-2)
 Average White Band Soul Searching 1976 Atlantic SD-18179
 Average White Band Benny & Us 1977 Atlantic 19105
 Average White Band Warmer Communications 1978 RCA 13053
 Average White Band Feel No Fret 1979 Atlantic 3063(UK)
 BFD BFD 1994 Canyon PCCY-00703
 Baby Grand Baby Grand 1978 Arista 4148
 Bad News Travels Fast Ordinary Man 1979 Casablanca NBLP-7181
 Bad News Travels Fast Look Out 1979 Casablanca NBLP-7138
 Bailey, Victor Bottom's Up 1989 Atlantic Jazz 7 81978-2
 Baker, Chet You Can't Go Home Again 1977 A&M/Horizon SP-726
 Baker, Chet The Best Thing for You 1977 A&M D22Y3920
 Basile, John John Basile 1995 Paddle Wheel KICJ-235
 Bazuka Bazuka 1975 A&M SP-3406 (3411)
 Beacco, Marc Scampi Fritti 1994 Verve 523 902-2
 Beacco, Marc Tomato Soup 1999 Polydor/Polygram 538 349-2
 Bear, Richard T Red Hot & Blue 1979 RCA 12927
 Beard, Jim Song of the Sun 1991 CTI R2 79478(847926-2)
 Beatle Jazz With a Little Help from My Fiends 2005 Lightyear 54685-2
 Beatnik Rebel Science Featuring Tony Verderosa 1993 CyberJam 7000122
 Beck, Joe Watch the Time 1977 Polydor (US)
 Beck, Joe Friends 1984 DMP CD-446
 Beirach, Richie Some Other Time – A Tribute to Chet Baker 1989 Triloka 180-2
 Belle, Regina Stay with Me 1989 Columbia CK44367
 Benson, George Pacific Fire 1975 CTI CTI-9010
 Benson, George Good King Bad 1975 CTI CTI-6062
 Benson, George Cast Your Fate to the Wind 1976 CTI CTI-8030
 Benson, George In Your Eyes 1983 Warner Bros. 9 23744-2
 Bernsen, Randy Mo' Wasabi 1986 Zebra ZEB-5857
 Black Heat Black Heat 1974 Atlantic SD 18128
 Black Light Orchestra This Time 1979 RCA KKL1-0326
 Blenzig, Charles Say What You Mean 1993 Big World BW2009
 Bliss, Peter Peter Bliss UA 728
 Blue Öyster Cult, Agents of Fortune 1976 Columbia PC34164
 Blue Suede Sneakers Blue Suede Sneakers
 Bluesiana Hot Sauce Bluesiana Hot Sauce 1994 Shanachie 5009
 Bofill, Angela Angie 1978 Arista GRP5000
 Bolin, Tommy From the Archives, Vol. 1 1975 Rhino R2 72194
 Bolton, Michael Soul Provider 1989 Columbia UCOL 45012
 Bona, Richard Scenes from My Life 1999
 Bonfa, Luiz Manhattan Strut 1974 Paddle Wheel KICJ-294
 Bootsy's Rubber Band Ahh...The Name Is Bootsy, Baby! 1977 WP P-10329W
 Bootsy's Rubber Band Stretchin' Out In 1976 Warner Bros. K56200(UK)
 Botti, Chris First Wish 1995 Verve Forecast 314 527 141-2
 Brackeen, Joanne Tring-a-Ling 1977 Choice CHCJ-1023
 Bramblett, Randall That Other Mile Polydor PD6045
 Brecker, Randy Score 1968 Solid State SS-18051
 Brecker, Randy Toe to Toe 1989 MCA MCAD-6334
 Brecker, Randy & Elias, Eliane Amanda 1985 Passport Jazz PJ 88013
 Brecker, Randy Some Skunk Funk 2005 Telarc – recorded in 2003
 Brickell, Edie Picture Perfect Morning 1994 Geffen GEFD-24715
 Brooklyn Dreams Sleepless Nights 1979 RCA 13071
 Brothers Johnson, The Blam!! 1979 A&M AMLH 64714
 Brown, Dean Here 2000 ESC/EFA 03673
 Brown, James I Got a Bag of My Own (Get on the Good) 1972 Polydor PD23004
 Brown, James Think/Something 1973 Polydor PD14177
 Brown, James Think (Alternate Take) 1973 Polydor PD14185
 Brown, James Slaughter's Big Rip-Off 1973 Polydor PD6015
 Brown, James Reality 1974 Polydor PD6039
 Brown, Peter Back to the Front 1983 RCA AFL1-4604
 Browne, Tom Browne Sugar 1979 Arista-GRP
 Brubeck, Darius Chaplin's Back Paramount PAS-6026
 Brubeck, Dave Young Lions & Old Tigers 1995 Telarc CD-83349
 Bronner, Till Midnight 1997 Button 9005
 Buchanan, Roy A Street Called Straight 1976 Atlantic SD 18170
 Buchanan, Roy Guitar on Fire – The Atlantic Sessions (Compilation) 1993 Rhino 71235-2
 Bullock, Hiram From All Sides 1986 Atlantic 7 81685-2
 Bullock, Hiram Give It What U Got 1987 Atlantic Jazz 7 81790-2
 Burton, Gary Times Like These 1988 GRP GRD-9569
 Butler, Jonathan Deliverance 1990 Jive 1329-2-J
 Butler, Jonathan Head to Head 1994 Mercury PHCR-1294
 Calderazzo, Joey In the Door 1991 Blue Note CDP 7 95138 2
 Calello Orchestra, The Charlie Calello Serenade 1979 Midsong MS1-010
 Cameo Word Up! 1986 Atlanta Artists 830 265-2 M-1
 Cameo Machismo 1988 Chocolate City CCLP-2011
 Cardona, Milton Cambucha (Carmen) 1999 AMCL 1028
 Carillo Street of Dreams 1979 Atlantic SD19235
 Carlton, Larry Friends 1983 Warner Bros. BSK 3635
 Carpenter, Karen Karen Carpenter 1996 A&M 31454-0588-2
 Carpenters, Lovelines 1996 A&M CD-3931
 Carter, Ron Anything Goes 1975 KUDU KU-25
 Casiopea Casiopea 1979 Alfa ALR 6017
 Cavaliere, Felix Destiny 1975 Bearsville K55505(6958)
 Chambers, Dennis Outbreak 2002 ESC/EFA 03682
 Cherry, Don Hear & Now 1976 Atlantic SD-18217
 Chesky Band, The David Rush Hour 1980 Columbia JC 36799
 Chic, Take It Off 1981 Atlantic SD19323
 Chindamo, Joe Reflected Journey 1997 A-Records AL 73120
 Bill Chinnock, Badlands 1978 Atlantic SD19191
 Ciccu, Bianca The Gusch 1989 JC 35336
 Cion, Sarah Jane Summer Night 2001 NAXOS 86071-2
 Circus Wonderful Music 1980 Alfa ALR 6036
 Clapton, Eric August 1986 Warner Bros. 25476-2
 Clayton-Thomas, David David Clayton 1978 ABC Word
 Clerc, Julien 1992
 Clinton, George and the P-Funk All Stars Plush Funk 1980 AEM 25671-2
 Coalkitchen Thirsty or Not..Choose Your Flavor Full Moon PE34827
 Cobham, Billy Crosswinds 1974 Atlantic SD 7300
 Cobham, Billy Total Eclipse 1974 Atlantic P-8539A
 Cobham, Billy Shabazz 1975 Atlantic P-10022A
 Cobham, Billy A Funky Thide of Sings 1975 Atlantic P-10079A
 Cobham, Billy Inner Conflicts 1978 Atlantic P-10530A
 Cole, Natalie Stardust 1996 ELECTR
 Colina, Michael Shadow of Urbano 1988 Private Music 2041-2-P
 Colina, Michael Rituals 1990 Private Music 2062-2-P
 Colombier, Michel Michel Colombier 1979 Chrysalis CHR 1212
 Copeland, Ruth Take Me to Baltimore 1976 RCA APL1-1236
 Copland, Marc Softly... 1998 Savoy Jazz – CY-18076
 Copland, Marc Marc Copland And... 2003 hatOLOGY 593
 Corea, Chick Three Quartets 1981 Warner Bros. BSK 3552
 Corgan, Billy Chicago University Great Hall 1996
 Coryell, Julian Without You 1996 TKCV-35001
 Coryell, Larry Difference 1978 Egg 900-558
 Coryell, Larry (Eleventh House), Aspects 1976 Arista AL 4077
 Costandinos, Alec R. Winds of Change 1979 Casablanca NBLT 7167
 Coster, Tom From the Street 1996 JVC JVC-2053-2
 Crack the Sky Crack the Sky 1975 Lifeson LS-6000
 Crack the Sky Crack Attic (The Best of Crack The Sky) (Compilation) 1997 Renaissance RMED 00182
 Crawford, Hank Tico Rico 1977 Kudu KU-35
 Crowbar Crowbar 1973 Epic 32746
 Cusson, Michael Wild Unit 2 1994 JMS JMS 074-2
 Dalto, Jorge Listen Up! 1978 Gala 139009-1
 Daltrey, Roger Parting Should Be Painless 1984 Warner Bros.
 Dealy Nightshade, The 1975 Phantom BPL1-0955
 Dee, Kiki Kiki Dee 1977 Rocket 2257
 Delano, Peter Peter Delano 1993 Verve 314 519 602-2
 Desmond Child and Rouge 1979 Capitol ST-11908
 Dibango, Manu Gone Clear 1980 Mango MLPS9539
 Dibango, Manu Ambassador 1981 Mango MLPS9658
 Dire Straits, Brothers in Arms 1985 Warner Bros. W2-25264
 DKO The Darren Kramer Organization, In the Now 2005 Rad Remark Music
 Doky Brothers Doky Brothers 1995 Blue Note 8369092
 Doky, Chris Minh Minh 1999 Video Arts VACM-1137
 Dolby's Cube, May the Cube Be With You (12", 2MIX) 1985 Parlophone 2R6100
 Dolby, Thomas Aliens Ate My Buick 1988 EMI-Manhattan CDP-7-48075-2
 Dreams Dreams 1970 Columbia C 3022592
 Dreams Imagine My Surprise 1971 Columbia C 30960
 Drews, J. D. J. D. Drews
 Dudziak, Urezula Sorrow Is Not Forever ... But Love Is 1983 Keystone KYT726
 Earland, Charles Coming to You Live 1980 Columbia JC36449
 Earland, Charles and Odyssey Revelation 1977 Mercury SRM-1-1149
 Eaton, William Struggle Buggy 1977 Marlin 2211
 Eigenberg, Julie Love Is Starting Now 1994 Geronimo PSCW-5075
 Eldar Eldar 2005 Sony Classical SK 92593
 Elias, Eliane So Far So Close 1989 Blue Note CDP 7 91411 2
 Elias, Eliane Eliane Elias Sings Jobim 1998 Blue Note CDP 7243 4 95050 2 5
 Erskine, Peter Peter Erskine 1982 Contemporary 14010
 Erskine, Peter Motion Poet 1988 Denon 32CY-2582
 Everything But The Girl, The Language of Life 1990 Cherry Red VPCK-85056
 Fabulous Rhinestones Free Wheelin' 1973 Just Sunshine JS9
 Faddis, Jon Good and Plenty 1978 Buddha/Versatile BDS5727
 Fagen, Donald, The Nightfly 1982 Warner Bros. 23696-1
 Fagner Fagner 1982 CBS 138250
 Fania All Stars Spanish Fever 1978 Columbia JC 35336
 Faro, Rachel Refugees
 Farrell, Joe La Catedral Y El Toro 1977 Warner Bros. P-10413W
 Ferber, Mordy Being There 2005 Half Note
 Finnerty, Barry New York City 1982 Victor VIJ-28020
 Finnerty, Barry Lights on Broadway 1984 Morning AM28-1
 Finnerty, Barry Space Age Blues (Compilation) 1998 Hot Wire EFA 12834-2
 Fisher, Bruce Red Hot 1977 Mercury SRMI-1158
 Flying Monkey Orchestra Back in the Pool 1993 Monkeyville MV 60101-2
 Flying Monkey Orchestra Mango Theory 1995 Monkeyville MV 60102-2
 Fogelberg, Dan The Innocent Aged 1981 FullMoon/Epic E2K 37393
 Fogelberg, Dan Exiles 1987 Full Moon/Epic OE 40271
 Fonda, Jane Prime Time Workout 1984 Elektra 60382-1
 Forman, Mitchel Train of Thought 1985 Magenta MD-0201
 Foster, Al Mixed Roots 1977 Laurie LES-6002
 Fotomaker Transfer Station 1979 Atlantic SD19246
 Foxy Hot Numbers 1979 T.K. Records TKR 83353
 Franklin, Aretha Aretha 1986 Arista ARCD 8556
 Franks, Michael The Art of Tea 1975 Warner Bros. MS2230
 Franks, Michael Sleeping Gypsy 1976 Warner Bros. P10306W
 Franks, Michael Objects of Desire 1982 Warner Bros. BSK 3648
 Franks, Michael Skin Dive 1985 Warner Bros. 9 25275-2
 Franks, Michael The Camera Never Lies 1987 Warner Bros. 32XD-734
 Franks, Michael Abandoned Garden 1995 Warner Bros. WPCR-400
 Franks, Michael Barefoot on the Beach 1999 Windham Hill 01934-11443-2
 Freeman, Michele Michele Freeman 1979 Polydor PD-1-6222
 Friesen, David Two for the Show 1993 ITM Pacific ITMP 970079
 Frisaura, Lorraine Be Happy for Me 1976 ATV PYE-12141
 Fruuchi, Toko Strength 1995 Sony SRCL 3306
 Fukamachi, Jun Jun Fukamachi Kitty MKY6003
 Fukamachi, Jun Spiral Steps 1976 Kitty MKF-1007
 Fukamachi, Jun Jun Fukamachi Live/Triangle Session 1977 Kitty MKF-1016
 Fukamachi, Jun On the Move 1978 Alfa ALR 6007
 Fukamachi, Jun Jun Fukamachi & N. Y. All Stars Live 1978 Alfa ALR 9002
 Funkadelic Electric Spanking of War Baby 1981 Warner Bros. BSK3482
 Gadd Gang, The Gadd Gang 1986 A Touch 2-8H-87
 Gaffney, Henry On Again Off Again 1978 Manhattan Island MR-LA861-H
 Gale, Eric Ginseng Woman 1977 Columbia PC 34421
 Galper, Hal Hal Galper Inner City
 Galper, Hal Wild Bird 1971 Mainstream MRL-354
 Galper, Hal The Guerilla Band 1973 Mainstream MRL 337
 Galper, Hal Reach Out! 1977 SteepleChase SCS-1067
 Galper, Hal Redux '78 1978 Concord Jazz CCD-4483
 Galper, Hal Speak with a Single Voice 1982 Enja Enja 4006
 Galper, Hal Quintet Children of the Night 1997 Double-Time DTRCD-125
 Garfunkel, Art Up 'Til Now (Compilation) Columbia
 Garfunkel, Art Fate for Breakfast 1979 CBS 35780
 Garfunkel, Art Scissors Cut 1981 CBS 37392
 Garfunkel, Art Lefty 1986 Columbia CK40942
 Garfunkel, Art Across America (Compilation) 1996 Hybrid HY20001
 Gatto, Roberto Notes 1988 Break Time BRJ-4067
 Gaynor, Gloria Experience 1975 MGM 2353119
 Geils (J Geils Band) Monkey Island 1977 Atlantic 19130
 Genoud, Moncef Aqua 2004 M&I MYCJ-30337
 Gibb, Andy After Dark 1980 RSO
 Gibb, Barry Now Voyager 1984 Polydor 25MM0385
 Gibbs, Mike & Burton, Gary The Public Interest 1973 Polydor 6503
 Gomez, Eddie Discovery 1985 Columbia CK 40548
 Gomez, Eddie Mezgo 1986 Epic Sony/A Touch 32.8H-65
 Gomez, Eddie Power Play 1988 Epic Sony/A Touch 32.8H-5004
 Gomez, Ray Volume 1980 Columbia JC 36243
 Googie And Tom Coppola Shine the Light of Love 1980 Columbia NJC36194
 Gray, Mark Boogie Hotel 1982 TDK T28P-1002
 Gray, Mark & Super Friends The Silencer 1984 East World EWJ-90032
 Green, Grant The Main Attraction 1976 Kudu KU-29
 Grimes, Carol Carol Grimes 1977 Decca SKLR5258
 Grolnick, Don Hearts and Numbers Hip Pocket HD106
 Grolnick, Don Weaver of Dreams 1990 Blue Note CDP 7 94591 2
 Grolnick, Don Medianoche 1995 Sweeca PCCY-00761
 Grolnick, Don The London Concert PEPCD008
 GRP All-Star Big Band All Blues GRP 98002
 Gross, Henry What's in a Name 1981 Capitol/EMI ST-12113
 Grusin, Dave West Side Story 1997 Encoded Music N2K-10021
 Haden, Charlie American Dreams 2002 Universal 064 096
 Hall, John John Hall 1978 Asylum 6E-117
 Hammer, Jan Drive 1994 Miramar MPCD2501
 Hancock, Herbie Magic Windows 1981 CBS FC37387
 Hancock, Herbie The Herbie Hancock Quartet Live 1994 Jazz Door 1270
 Hancock, Herbie The New Standard 1996 Verve 527 715-2
 Hancock, Herbie The New Standard Special Edition 1996 Verve POCJ-9091/2
 Hara, Kumiko No Smoking 1977 Kitty MKF1027
 Harris, Allen Oceans Between Us 1978 CBS 82844
 Hayashida, Kenji Marron 1995 Victor VICL-765
 Heirs To Jobim A Tribute to Antonio Carlos Jobim 1995 BV. BVCR-1422
 High Inergy, Hold On 1980 Gordy G8-996M1
 Hino, Terumasa Day Dream 1980 Flying Disk VIJ-28003
 Hino, Terumasa New York Times 1983 CS 35DH50
 Hinze, Chris Parcival 1976 Philips 6629006
 Hinze, Chris Senang 1996 Keytone KYT 794 CD
 Hinze, Chris Combination Bamboo Magic 1977 Atlantic SD 19185
 Holliday, Jennifer I'm on Your Side 1991 Arista 18578-2
 Holmes, Rupert Pursuit of Happiness 1980 MCA 3241
 Horne, Lena The Lady and Her Music – Live on Broadway 1981 Qwest 2QW3597
 Horny Horns, The Final Blow 1980 PV PCD-2767
 Hubbard, Freddie Windjammer 1976 Columbia PC-34166
 Hue and Cry Remote 1988 Circa VJD-32103
 Hue and Cry JazzNotJazz 1996 Linn akd 057
 Ide, Yasuaki Cool Blue 1995 Ki/oon Sony KSC2 120
 Imada, Masaru Carnival 1981 Trio/Full House PAP-25009
 Irvine, Weldon Sinbad 1976 RCA APL1-1363
 Ish Ish 1976 Clouds 8808
 Itoh, Kimiko A Touch of Love 1986 Epic Sony/A Touch 32.8H-66
 Itoh, Kimiko For Lovers Only 1987 Epic Sony/A Touch 32.8H-136
 Itoh, Kimiko Standards My Way 1993 VideoArts Music VACV-1008
 Itoh, Kimiko Sophisticated Lady 1995 VideoArts Music VACV-1021
 James, Bob Heads 1977 Columbia JC 34896
 James, Bob Lucky Seven 1979 Columbia 36056
 James, Bob The Genie 1983 Tappan Zee
 James, Bob Obsession 1986 Warner Bros. 9 25495-2
 James, Bob Grand Piano Canyon 1990 Warner Bros. 9 26256-2
 James, Bob Restless 1994 Warner Bros. 9 45536-2
 James, Mark Mark James
 James, Rick Come Get It! 1978 Gordy G7-981R1
 James, Rick Bustin' Out of L Seven 1979 Gordy G7-984R1
 James, Tommy Three Times in Love 1980 RVC RVP-6471
 Jarreau, Al Tenderness 1994 Reprise 9 45422-2
 Jeffreys, Garland Ghost Writer 1977 A&M SP-4629
 Jeffreys, Garland One-Eyed Jack 1978 A&M SP-4681
 Jeffreys, Garland Escape Artist 1980 Epic 36983
 Jeffreys, Garland Don't Call Me Buckwheat 1991 RCA PD 90588
 Joel, Billy 52nd Street 1978 Columbia FC 35609
 Joel, Billy An Innocent Man 1983 Columbia CK 38837
 Joel, Billy The Bridge 1986 Columbia CK 40402
 John, Elton Blue Moves 1976 MCA MCAD 6011
 Johnson, Michael Dialogue 1979 EMI America SW-17010
 Jonah Jonah 1974 20th Cent T-456
 Jones, Quincy Sounds...Stuff Like That!! 1978 A&M SP 4685
 Jospe Inner Rhythm, Robert Blue Blaze
 Kadomatsu, Toshiki Before the Daylight 1988 BV M32D-1001
 Karizma (Forever in the) Arms of Love 1989 SOHBI/Creatchy SFB-1001
 Kasai, Kimiko My One and Only Love 1986 CBS Sony 32DH-51
 Kasai, Kimiko My Favorite Songs No. 1 (Compilation) 1999 Sony SRCS-8991
 Kawasaki, Ryo Mirror of My Mind 1979 Open Sky 25AP-1021
 Kenia Initial Thrill Zebra
 Khan, Chaka Chaka 1978 Warner Bros. BSK 3245
 Khan, Chaka Naughty 1980 Warner Bros. BSK 3385
 Khan, Chaka What Cha' Gonna Do for Me 1981 Warner Bros. HS 3526
 Khan, Chaka Chaka Khan 1982 Warner Bros. 92.3729-1
 Khan, Chaka Destiny 1986 Warner Bros. 925425-1
 Khan, Steve Tightrope 1977 Tappan Zee 1977
 Khan, Steve The Blue Man 1978 Columbia JC 35539
 Khan, Steve Arrows 1979 Columbia JC 36129
 Khan, Steve Crossings 1994 Verve
 King, Carole City Streets 1989 Capitol C1-90885
 Kishino, Yoshiko Fairy Tale 1995 GRP MVCR-30001
 Kishino, Yoshiko Randezvous 1997 Universal Victor MVCJ-2901
 Kleeer Winners 1979 Atlantic SD19262
 Kleeer The Very Best of Kleer (Compilation) 1998 Rhino R2 75218
 Klugh, Earl Life Stores 1986 Warner Bros. 9 25478-2
 Knight, Gladys & The Pips Midnight Train to Georgia 1973
 Knight, Gladys & The Pips About Love 1980 Columbia JC38367
 Knight, Holly Holly Knight 1989 Columbia FC44243
 Knopfler, Mark Local Hero (Original Sound Track) 1983 Vertigo 811 038-2
 Kubota, Toshinobu Neptune 1992 Sony SRCL2429
 Kühn, Joachim Nightline New York 1981 Inak 869
 Kühn, Joachim Survivor 2005 ASOJ QSCA-1028
 Kühn, Rolf Inside Out 1999 Int 3276
 Larsen, Neil Jungle Fever 1978 A&M/Horizon SP-733
 Larsen, Neil High Gear 1979 A&M/Horizon SP-738
 Larsen, Neil Through Any Window 1987 MCA MCAD-42018
 Last, James Band Seduction 1980 Polydor MP-2625
 Lateef, Yusef Temple Garden 1979 CTI
 Lawrence, Mike Nightwind 1988 Optimism 3104
 Laws, Hubert The Chicago Theme 1974 CTI CTI-6058
 Lebous, Martee The Lady Wants to Be a Star Image IM-301
 Ledford, Mark Miles 2 Go 1998 Verve Forecast POCJ-1402
 Lee, Will Bird House 2002 SKP 9026
 Lee, John & Brown, Garry Still Can't Say Enough 1976 Blue Note 701
 Leer, Thijs van Nice to Have Met You 1978 CBS 86059
 Lennon, John Mind Games 1973 Apple 3414
 Lennon, John Absolutely Elsewhere 1998 Vigotone VT-156-B
 Lennon, Julian Valotte 1984 Atlantic A1-80184
 Leonhart, Jay & Friends Live at Fat Tuesday's 1993 DRG DRG 8439
 Lewis, Mel Mel Lewis and Friends 1977 A&M/Horizon SP-716
 Lieberman, Lori Letting Go 1978 Millennium MNLP8005
 Lippert, Jan Hard Company Imprints 1999 Storyville STCD4228
 Little Feat Representing the Mambo 1990 Warner Bros. 9 26163-2
 Little River Band Too Late to Load EMI Australia CDP791693
 Lloyd, Ian Goose Bumps 1979 Scotti Brothers 7104
 Loeb, Chuck Life Colors 1990 dmp CD-475
 Loeb, Chuck The Music Inside 1996 Shanachie 5022
 Loggins, Kenny Keep the Fire 1979 CBS 36172
 Longmire, Wilbert Champagne 1979 Tappan Zee JC 35754
 Lynn, Cheryl In Love 1979 CBS 83829
 McCord, Kat Baby Come Out Tonight 1979 Mercury 9124 383
 MacDonald, Ralph The Path 1978 Marlin 2210
 MacDonald, Ralph Counter Point 1979 Marlin 2229
 MacDonald, Ralph Just the Two of Us 1996 Video Arts VACM-1116
 Mack, Jimmy On the Corner 1979 Atlantic BT 76014
 Mahogany, Kevin My Romance 1998 Warner Bros. 9 47025-2
 Mainieri, Mike Love Play 1977 Arista
 Mainieri, Mike Wanderlust 1981 Warner Bros. BSK 3586
 Manchester, Melissa Emergency 1983 Arista AL8-8094
 Mandoki, Leslie People in Room No. 8 Polydor 537 213-2
 Mandoki, Leslie People 1993 BMG 74321 182402
 Mandoki, Leslie The Jazz Cuts 1997 Polymedia 537 267-2
 Manhattan Transfer Anthology: Down in Birdland (Compilation) 1992 Rhino R2 71053
 Manhattan Transfer The Manhattan Transfer 1975 Atlantic SD-18133
 Manhattan Transfer Coming Out 1976 Atlantic SD-18183
 Mann, Herbie Yellow Fever 1979 Atlantic SD 19252
 Mann, Herbie Mellow 1981 Atlantic SD16046
 Marcovitz, Diana Joie De Vivre! 1976 Kama Sutra KSBS2614
 Mardin, Arif Journey 1974 Atlantic SD1661
 Marsh, Hugh The Bear Walks 1986 VeraBra No.11
 Mason, Robert Star Drive Elektra EKS 75058E
 Master Mind Prelude RCA IC-30807
 Masuda, Mikio Going Away 1979 Electric Bird SKS 8011
 Masuo, Yoshiaki Song is You and Me 1980 Electric Bird KICJ-2004
 Matthews, David Shoogie Wanna Boogie 1976 KUDU 30
 Matthews, David Digital Love 1980 Electric Bird SKS 8010
 Matthews, David Grand Cross 1981 Electric Bird K22P 6068
 Matthews, David Super Funky Sax 1984 GNPS 2169
 Mauriat, Paul Overseas Call 1978 Mercury SRM-1-3746
 Mayall, John Bottom Line 1979 DJM 23
 McCoo, Marilyn & Billy Davis Jr. Marilyn & Billy 1978 Columbia JC35603
 McGriff, Jimmy Red Beans 1976 Groove Merchant GM-3324
 McLaughlin, John The Promise 1995 Verve 529 828-2
 Melanie Phonogenic 1978 Midsong 3033
 Mendoza Project, The Mardin Jazz Pana 1993 Zero XRCN-1034
 Mendoza, Vince Vince Mendoza 1989 Fun House 32GD-7022
 Mendoza, Vince Epiphany 1997 ZebraAcoustic ZA 44407-2
 Mercuty, Eric Gimme a Call Sometime 1981 Capitol ST-12166
 Pat Metheny, 80/81 1980 ECM ECM 1180
 Midler, Bette Songs for the New Depression 1976 Atlantic SD18155
 Midler, Bette Thighs and Whispers 1979 Atlantic SD16004
 Miles, Jason World Tour 1994 Lipstick LIP8921
 Miles, Jason Mr. X 1996 Lightyear 54170-2
 Miles, Jason Miles to Miles 2005 Narada Jazz 072435-60601-2-8
 Mingus, Charles Me, Myself An Eye 1978 Atlantic SD-8803
 Mingus, Charles Something Like a Bird 1980 Atlantic SD-8805
 Mintzer, Bob Papa Lips 1984 CBS Sony 28AP-2881
 Mintzer, Bob Twin Tenors 1994 Novus (BMG Victor) BVCJ-605
 Mintzer, Bob Big Band Incredible Journey 1985 DMP CD-451
 Mitchell, Joni, Shadows and Light 1980 Asylum BB-704
 Miyake, Jun Especially Sexy 1984 TDK T28P-1005
 Moffett, Charnett Net Man 1987 Blue Note CJ32-5001
 Monheit, Jane Come Dream with Me 2002 Columbia 509477 2
 Morris, Russel Russel Morris 1975 RCA APLI-1073B
 Mouzon, Alphonse Morning Sun 1981 Pausa 7107
 Mouzon, Alphonse Distant Lover 1982 Highrise HR100AE
 Move To Groove The Best of 1970's Jazz-Funk 1972 Verve
 Muhammad, Idris House of the Rising Sun 1976 KUDU KU-27
 Muhammad, Idris Turn This Mutha Out 1977 KUDU KU-34
 Muldaur, Jenni Jenni Muldaur 1993 Warner Bros. 26862-2
 Mulligan, Gerry Little Big Horn 1983 GRP GRD-9503
 Murata, Yoich Solid Brass What's Bop? 1997 JVC VIC J-227
 Murphy, Elliott Night Lights 1976 RCA APLI-1318
 Murphy, Mark Stolen & Other Moments (Compilation) 1997 32Jazz 32036
 Murphy, Mark Bridging a Gap 1973 Muse MR5009
 Murphy, Mark Mark Murphy Sings 1975 Muse MR5078
 Nakagawa, Eijiro Peace 1998 Paddle Wheel (King) KICJ 333
 Nakamura, Teruo Super Friends 1985 East World EWJ-90039
 National Lampoon National Lampoon 1975 PE 33956
 Nelson, Willie Across the Borderline 1993 Columbia CK 52752
 New Sounds in Brass New Sounds Special II 1998 EMI TOCZ-9317
 New Yorkers I Believe in Love (7") 1980 WP P-634W
 Nguini, Vincent Symphony-Bantu 1994 Mesa R2 79067
 Nightingale, Maxine Lead Me On 1979 Windsong BXL1-3404
 Nils Landgren Funk Unit Paint It Blue 1996 Act 9243-2
 Niteflyte Niteflyte 1979 Ariola America
 Nock, Mike In Out and Around 1978 Timeless SJP119
 Nogitish, Uganda Forgotten Love Is Dead 1979 Columbia 33331
 Noguchi, Goro GORO in New York 1977 Taurus TACX-2448
 Norby, Cecilie My Corner of the Sky 1996 EMI-Blue Note 8534222
 Nyro, Laura Smile 1976 Columbia 33912
 Nyro, Laura Walk the Dog & Light the Light 1993 Columbia
 O'Connor, Mark On the Mark 1989 W.B. 925
 Odyssey Odyssey 1977 RCA APL1-2204
 Odyssey I Got the Melody 1981 RCA AFL1-3910
 Ogerman, Claus Gate of Dreams 1976 Warner Bros. 3006-2
 Ogerman, Claus Featuring Michael Brecker GRP 9632
 Ohnuki, Taeko Copine 1985 MIL-1004
 Ono, Lisa Essencia 1997 EMI TOCT-9999
 Ono, Yoko Walking on Thin Ice (Compilation)
 Ono, Yoko Ono Box
 Ono, Yoko Feeling the Space 1973 Apple EW3412
 Ono, Yoko A Story 1974 Rykodisc VACK-5376
 Ono, Yoko Seasons of Glass 1981 Geffen 2004
 Orleans Still the One (Compilation)
 Orleans Waking & Dreaming 1976 Asylum 7E-1070
 Osmond, Donny Donny Osmond 1988 Virgin CDV2469
 Osmond, Donny Eyes Don't Lie 1990 TE. TOCP-6442
 Pacific Gas & Electric Starring Charie Allen 1973 Dunhil 157
 Pages Pages 1978 Epic PE 35459
 Pages Future Street 1979 Epic PE 36209
 Palmer, Robert Double Fun 1978 Island ILPS9476(UK)
 Palmieri, Eddie Listen Here 2005 Concord CCD-2276-2
 Pao, Eugene Outlet 1990 Wea 9031-72853-2
 Pao, Eugene By the Company You Keep 1996 Somethin' Else 5577
 Pao, Eugene Naked Time FPP 200403
 Parliament Mothership Connection 1976 Casablanca 7022
 Parliament Clones of Dr. Frunkenstein 1976 Casablanca 7034
 Parliament Trombipulation 1980 Casablanca NBLP7249
 Paris, Mica If You Could Love Me 2004 Wounded Bird WOU 5000
 Pasqua, Alan Milagro 1994 SoundHills SSCD 8058
 Pasqua, Alan Delications 1995 Postcards 1212
 Pastorius, Jaco Jaco Pastorius 1975 Epic PE 33949
 Pastorius, Jaco Word of Mouth 1981 Warner Bros. BSK 3535
 Pastorius, Jaco The Birthday Concert 1995 Warner Bros. 9362-45290-2
 Patitucci, John John Patitucci 1988 GRP GRD-9560
 Patitucci, John On the Corner 1989 GRP GRD-9583
 Patitucci, John Sketchbook 1990 GRP GRD-9617
 Patitucci, John Another World 1993 GRP GRD-9725
 Patitucci, John One More Angel 1997 Concord CCD-4753-2
 Patitucci, John Now 1998 Concord CCD-4806-2
 Pavlov's Dog The Sound of the Bell 1976 CBS 33694
 Phillips, Esther What a Diff'rence a Day Makes 1975 Kudu KU-23
 Phillips, Esther Performance 1975 Kudu 18
 Phillips, Esther For All We Know 1976 Kudu 28(UK)
 Phillips, Esther Capricon Princess 1977 Kudu 31(UK)
 Players Association Born to Dance 1978 Vanguard VSD79398
 Players Association Turn the Music Up 1979 Vanguard VSD79421
 Pommer, Georg Coast to Coast 1995 Button 9001
 Pope, Odean Locked & Loaded 2006 Half Note 4526
 Prairie Madness Prairie Madness 1971 Columbia 31003
 Pratt, Andy Shiver in the Night 1977 Nemperor NE443
 Purdie, Bernard Soul to Jazz 1996 ACT 9242-2
 Purim, Flora Everyday Everynight 1978 Milestone M9084
 Pussez! Leave That Boy Alone! 1980 Vanguard VSD79433
 Rainbow featuring Will Boulware Crystal Green 1978 East Wind EW-8501
 Rainbow, Will Boulware Over Crystal Green 2002 FFO 0015
 Ramblerny School 66 (Summer Big Band Camp) 1966
 Rangell, Nelson Members Only 1987 Muse MCD 5332
 Rankin, Kenny Here in My Heart 1997 Private Music 0100582148-2
 Rare Silk New Weave 1983 Polydor(E) 810 028-2
 Lou Reed, Between Thought and Expression
 Lou Reed, Berlin 1973 RCA 10207
 Lou Reed, New Sensations Word RCA AFL1-4998
 Reedus, Tony & Urban Relations People Get Ready 1998 Sweet Basil TECW-25733
 Reynolds, L.J. L. J. Reynolds 1991 Bellmark 77003
 Rezza, Vito Drums of Avila 2004 Alma ACD14302
 Rhodes, Rick Indian Summer 1995 Geronimo PSCW-5319
 Rhodes, Rick Deep in the Night 1998 Award 80001
 Riel, Alex Unriel 1997 Stunt STUCD19707
 Ritchie Family Bad Reputation 1979 Casablanca
 Rivera, Scarlet Scarlet Fever 1978 Warner Bros. BSK 3174
 Roney, Wallace Village 1997 Warner Bros.
 Ross, Diana Red Hot Rhythm and Blues 1987 RCA 6388-1-R
 Ross, Diana The Boss 1979 Motown STML12118(UK)
 Ross, Diana Why Do Fools Fall in Love 1981 Capitol 26733(UK)
 Ross, Diana Swept Away 1984 RCA AFL1-5009
 Rubalcaba, Gonzalo Inner Voyage 1999 Blue Note
 Rundgren, Todd Something/Anything? 1972 Warner Bros. 2BX 2066
 Rundgren, Todd A Wizard, A True Star 1973 Bearsville 2133
 Rundgren, Todd Todd 1974 Bearsville 6952
 Saint & Stephanie Saint & Stephanie
 Salvatore, Sergio Tune Up 1994 GRP GRD-9846
 Salvatore, Sergio Point of Presence 1997 N2K Encoded Music N2K-10018
 Sanborn, David Inside 1999 Elektra 7559-62346-2
 Sanborn, David Taking Off 1975 Warner Brother BS 2873
 Sanborn, David Heart to Heart 1978 Warner Brother BSK 3189
 Sanborn, David Straight to the Heart 1984 Warner Brother 9 25150 2
 Sanborn, David A Change of Heart 1987 Warner Brother W1-25479
 Sandke, Randy New York Stories 1986Stash ST-264
 Sandke, Randy The Sandke Brothers (Compilation) 1993 Stash CD-575
 Sandke, Randy Chase 1995 Concord CCD-4642
 Sandoval, Arturo Swingin 1996
 Sandoval, Arturo Hot House 1998 N2K 10023
 Santamaria, Mongo Red Hot 1979 Tappan Zee
 Satten, Steve Whatcha Gonna Do for Me? 1975 Columbia PC33478
 Saxophone Summit Gathering of Spirits Telarc CD-83607
 Schlitz, Don Dreamers Matinee 1980
 Sebesky, Don The Rape of El Morro 1975 CTI CTI-6061
 Section 72 Section 72 Warner Bros. BS2661
 Seifert, Zbigniew Zbigniew Seifert Capitol 11618
 Sidran, Ben Freen in America 1976 Arista AL4081
 Sidran, Ben Live at Montreux 1978 Arista AB4218 92
 Sidran, Ben The Cat and the Hat 1979 A&M/Horizon LJ741
 Siegel, Janis The Tender Trap 1999 MONA-1021
 Silver, Horace The Best of Horace Silver Volume Two 1972 Blue Note CDP 7 93206 2
 Silver, Horace In Pursuit of the 27th Man 1972 Blue Note LA054-F
 Silver, Horace The Hardbop Grandpop 1996 Impulse! IMPD-192
 Silver, Horace A Prescription of the Blues 1997 Impulse! IMPD-238
 Simon & Garfunkel Old Friends 1993 Print 001/002
 Simon, Carly Coming Around Again 1987 Arista A32D-11
 Simon, Carly Carly Simon's Romulus Hunt 1993 Angel CDQ 54915 2
 Simon, Carly Hotcakes 1974 Elektra 75049
 Simon, Carly Boys in the Trees 1978 Elektra
 Simon, Carly Spy 1979 Elektra 5E506
 Simon, Carly Torch 1981 Warner Brother 3592
 Simon, Carly Hello Big Man 1983 Warner Brother 23866-1
 Simon, Carly Greatest Hits Live 1988 Arista A32D-58
 Simon, Carly My Romance 1990 Arista ARCD-8582
 Simon, Carly Have You Seen Me Lately? 1990 Arista ARCD-8650
 Simon, Harris New York Connection 1978 Jimco Music EWCD 701
 Simon, Harris Swish 1980 Jimco Music EWCD 710
 Simon, John Out on the Street 1992 Pioneer LDC PICP-1001
 Simon, Paul Still Crazy After All These Years 1975 CBS 33540
 Simon, Paul The Rhythm of the Saints 1990 Warner Bros. 9 26098-2
 Simon, Paul Paul Simon's Concert in the Park 1991 Warner Bros. 26737-2
 Simon, Paul Live USA 1991 imm 40.90149
 Simon, Paul Paul Simon 1992 Pluto PLR CD9229
 Simone Seducao 1988 CBS 231157
 Sinatra, Frank L. A. Is My Lady 1984 Qwest/WarnerBrothers 25145-1
 Sivertsen, Kenneth Remembering North 1994 NYC NYC 6007-2
 SIXUN Lunatic Taxi 1995 Verve 528 785-2
 SMAP 006 SEXY SIX 1994 Victor VICL 540
 SMAP 007 Gold Singer 1995 Victor VICL 671
 SMAP 008 Tacomax 1996 Victor VICL 745
 SMAP 009 1996 Victor VICL-800
 SMAP WOOL (Compilation) 1997 JVC VICL-40212/3
 Smappies Rhythmsticks 1996 Victor VICP8165
 Smappies Smappies II 1999 JVC VICP60719
 Smith, Michael W Big Picture 1985 Reunion 66166-2
 Snow, Phoebe Against the Grain 1978
 Snow, Phoebe Never Letting Go 1977
 SOS All Stars, The New York Rendezvous 1987 CMG 8001
 Spinners Love Trippin 1980 Atlantic SD19270
 Spinozza, David Spinozza 1977 A&M SP-4677
 Springsteen, Bruce Born to Run 1975 CBS 33795
 Spyro Gyra Morning Dance 1979 MCA MCAD 37148
 Spyro Gyra Carnaval 1980 MCA MCA-5149
 Spyro Gyra Freetime 1981 MCA MCA-5238
 Stardrive Intergalactic Trot 1973 Elektra EK75058
 Stark & McBrian Big Star
 Starr, Ringo Ringo's Rotogravure 1975 Atlantic SD 18193
 Starr, Ringo Ringo the Fourth 1977 Polydor ATCO19108
 Staton, Candi Young Hearts Run Free
 Staton, Candi Candi Staton 1980 W.B. BSK3428
 Staton, Candi Chance 1979 W.B. BSK3333
 Steely Dan Gold (Compilation) 1982 MCA MCF3145
 Steely Dan, Gaucho 1980 MCA MCAD 37220
 Stern, Mike Time in Place 1988 Atlantic Jazz 7 81840-2
 Stern, Mike Jigsaw 1989 Atlantic Jazz 7 82027-2
 Stern, Mike Is What It Is 1994 Atlantic Jazz 82571-2
 Stern, Mike Give and Take 1997 Atlantic 7567-83036-2
 Stern, Mike Voices 2001 Atlantic 7567-83483-2
 Stones, Time & Elements A Humanist Requiem 1994 DIGITAL NPD 85573
 Stone Alliance Heads Up 1980 PM K-149
 Sunshine Sunshine 1977 Roulette SR3018
 Super Nova Brazilian Jazz - The Music and Lyrics of Claudia Villela 1998 Jazzhead JH 9504
 Superfriends Taste of Superfriends 1992
 Syms, Sylvia She Loves to Hear the Music 1978 A&M SP-4696
 T-Square and Friends Miss You in New York 1995 Sony SRCL-3330
 Takahashi, Mariko Couplet 1994 Victor VICL-558
 Taylor, James One Man Dog 1972 Warner Bros. 2660
 Taylor, James Walking Man 1974 Warner Bros. B523794
 Taylor, James In the Pocket 1976 Warner Bros. 2912
 Taylor, James That's Why I'm Here 1985 Columbia CK 40052
 Taylor, James Never Die Young 1988 Columbia CK 40851
 Taylor, James New Moon Shine 1991 Columbia CK 46038
 Taylor, James Hourglass 1997 Columbia CK 67912
 Taylor, Kate Kate Taylor 1978 Columbia PC35089
 Tee, Richard Strokin'  1978 Tappan Zee JC 35695
 Terrason, Jacky What It Is 1998 Blue Note 7243 4 98756 2 3
 Third World Serious Business 1989 MME. PHCR-4742
 Third World Reggae Ambassadors: 20th Anniversary (Compilation)
 Thomas, B. J. Longhorn & London Bridges 1974 Paramount 1020
 Thomas, Joe Feelin's from Within 1976 Groove Merchant GM-3315
 Thursday Diva Follow Me 1995 Dmp CD-509
 Tolvan Big Band Colours
 Tomlinson, Malcom Coming Outta Nowhere
 Tornader Hit It Again 1977 Polydor PL1 6098
 Tramaine The Search Is Over 1986 A&M 395110-1
 Tropea, John Tropea 1976 Marlin 2200
 Tropea, John Short Trip to Space 1977 T. K. 14061
 Tropea, John To Touch You Again 1978 Marlin 2222
 Turner Tina Love Explosion 1978 Ariola 206543
 Two Siberians Out of Nowhere 2005 Heads Up HUCD 3096
 Tyler, Bonnie Secret Dreams And Forbidden Fire 1986 Columbia OC 40312
 Tyner, McCoy Trio Featuring Michael Brecker Infinity 1995 Impluse! IMPD-17
 UZEB Fast Emotion 1982 Cream CR 0 22-2
 Urbanator Urbanator 1994 Hip Bop HIBD8001
 Vallie, Frankie Lady Put the Light Out 1977 PrivateStock PS7002
 Vandross, Luther Forever, For Always, For Love 1982 Epic FE38235
 Vannoni, Ornella Ornella E... 1986 CGD 21219
 Various Artists It Happened in ... Pescara 1969–1989 Philology W100/101
 Various Artists The Atlantic Family Live in Montreux 1978 Atlantic SD2-3000
 Various Artists Montreux Jazz Festival – 25th Anniversary 1981 Warner WE888
 Various Artists Brastilava Jazz Days 1987 Opus (Cz) OE5549
 Various Artists A Homeless Children's Medical Benefit Concert 1987 Yellow Cat YC 013/14
 Various Artists Jazz Pizazz 1991 Novus/Bluebird/RCA RDJ 61083-2
 Various Artists The Fabulous Pescara Jam Sessions 1970–1975 1991 Philology W96-2
 Various Artists Two Rooms – Celebrating the Songs of Elton John & Bernie Taupin 1991 Polydor 845 750-2
 Various Artists Casino Lights – Live at Montreux (CD Only) 1993 Warner Bros. 23718-2
 Various Artists It's a Jazz Thing 1993 EVA 74321181512
 Various Artists Pazz and Jops 1994 1994 GRP MVCR-164
 Various Artists Jazz to the World 1995 Blue Note CDP 7243 8 32127 2 9
 Various Artists For Our Children Too 1996 Kid Rhino R2 72494
 Various Artists Who Loves You – A Tribute to Jaco Pastorius 1998 JVC VICJ-60185
 Vazquez, Papo At the Point V. One 1999 Cubop CBCD015
 Vick, Harold - After the Dance 1977 WOLF 1202
 Vollenweider, Andreas Kryptos 1997 Sony Classical
 Voudouris, Roger Radio Dream 1979 W.B. BSK3290
 Walden, Narada Michael Awakening 1979 Atlantic SD19222
 Walden, Chris Orchestra Ticino 1996 ACT 9229-2
 Waldman, Randy Wigged Out
 Watanabe, Kazumi To Chi Ka 1980 Better Days YX-7265ND
 Watanabe, Kazumi MOBO (DISK 1/2) 1983 Trio/Domo AW-20006/7
 Watanabe, Kazumi Mobo (Complete Original) 1986 Domo H60P-20121
 Watanabe, Kazumi Mobo Splash 1985 Domo H33P-20050
 Watanabe, Misato Spirits 1996 EPIC/Sony ESCB1742
 Watanabe, Sadao Morning Island 1979 Flying Disk VIJ-6018
 Watts, Jeff "Tain" Bar Talk Columbia 508157 2
 Weckl, Dave Master Plan 1990 GRP GRD-9619
 Wendroff, Michael Michael Wendroff 1973 Buddha BDS5130
 Wesley, Fred & The Horny Horns A Blow for Me, A Toot to You 1977 Atlantic SD-18214
 Kenny Wheeler, Double, Double You 1983 ECM ECM 1262
 White Elephant White Elephant 1972 Just Sunshine JSS-3000
 White, Lenny Present Tense 1996 Hip Bop HIBD 8004
 White, Lenny Renderers of Spirit 1996 Omagatoki
 White, Michael Project 3 Take That 1997 Pony Canyon PCCY-01155
 Whitlock, Amber The Colours of Life 2005 Sketchin
 Whitlock, Rob Sketchin'  2005 Sketchin
 Whitlock, Rob Sketchin' 2 2006 Sketchin
 Wild Cherry Electrified Funk 1977
 Wild Cherry I Love My Music 1978 Epic 35011
 Wilkins, Jack You Can't Live Without It 1976 Chiaroscuro CR 185
 Wilkins, Jack Merge (Compilation) 1992 Chiaroscuro CR 156
 Wilkins, Jack Reunion 2001 Chiaroscuro
 Williams, Patrick New York Band 10th Avenue 1987 Soundwings SWD-2103
 Williams, Tony The Joy of Flying 1979 CBS JC35705
 Williams, Tony Wilderness 1996 ARK21 72438 54571 2 8
 Winkel, de Torsten Mastertouch 1989 Optimism OP CD-321
 Winter, Johnny John Dawson Winter III 1974 Blue Sky 33292
 Writers, The All in Fun 1979 Columbia JL 35768
 XL Jukola 1998 Pohjola PELPCD 10
 Yonekura, Toshinori Cool Jamz 1995 Pioneer LDC (Japan)
 Yoshida, Minako Light 'n Up 1982 Alfa ALR28040
 Yoshida, Miwa Beauty and Harmony 1995 Epic/Sony ESCB1710
 Frank Zappa, Zappa in New York 1976 Warner Bros. 2D 2290
 Zappa, Frank Läther 1976 Rykodisc RCD10574/76
 Zappa, Frank Leatherette/1977 1977 Four Aces FAR008
 Frank Zappa You Can't Do That on Stage Anymore, Vol. 6 1992 Ryokodisc RCD10571/72
 Zonjic, Alexander Romance With You 1988 Optimism OP CD3207

External links
Discogs
Allmusic credits

Jazz discographies
Discographies of American artists